The 2018 Men's Junior European Volleyball Championship took place in Netherlands and Belgium from 14 to 22 July 2018.

Participating teams
 Hosts
 
 
 Qualified through 2018 Men's U20 Volleyball European Championship Qualification

Preliminary round

Pool I

|}

|}

Pool II

|}

|}

5th–8th classification

5th–8th Semifinals

|}

7th place match

|}

5th place match

|}

Final round

Semifinals

|}

3rd place match

|}

Final

|}

Final standing

Individual awards

Most Valuable Player
  Konstantin Abaev
Best Setter
  Konstantin Abaev
Best Outside Spikers
  Matthieu Vanneste
  Bennie Tuinstra

Best Middle Blockers
  Sjors Tijhuis
  Josef Polak
Best Opposite Spiker
  Marek Šotola
Best Libero
  Tim Verstraete

See also
2018 Women's U19 Volleyball European Championship

Men's Junior European Volleyball Championship
European Championship U20
International volleyball competitions hosted by the Netherlands
International volleyball competitions hosted by Belgium
Volleyball European Championship
Volleyball European Championship
Volleyball European Championship
Volleyball European Championship
July 2018 sports events in the Netherlands